Ruttan may refer to:

Charles Edwin Ruttan, painter
Deric Ruttan (born 1972), Canadian country music artist from Bracebridge, Ontario
Henry Norlande Ruttan (1848–1925), Canadian engineer and Canadian Army Officer
Henry Ruttan (1792–1871), businessman, inventor and politician figure in Upper Canada
Jack Ruttan (1889–1973), Canadian amateur ice hockey player and coach
James Farrand Ruttan (1850–1904), real estate agent and politician in Ontario
John Paul Ruttan (born 2001), Canadian child actor, played Joe in the film This Means War
John Ruttan, mayor of Nanaimo, British Columbia, Canada
Robert Fulford Ruttan, FRSC (1856–1930), Canadian chemist and university professor
Susan Ruttan (born 1948), American actress
Vernon Wesley Ruttan (1924–2008), development economist at the University of Minnesota

See also
Rutan (disambiguation)